Dylan Ozan Moyo Bahamboula (born 22 May 1995) is a professional footballer who plays as a midfielder for Scottish Premiership club Livingston. Born in France, he represents the Republic of the Congo at international level.

Club career
Bahamboula began his career in the Monaco academy, making 46 appearances for the B-Team. In July 2016, Bahamboula moved from Monaco to Dijon.

In January 2019 he signed for Algerian club CS Constantine .

He joined Bulgarian side Tsarsko Selo in October 2019, scoring two league goals for the club in 17 appearances, one of them coming in the prestigious 2:1 win over CSKA Sofia, before leaving the team in August 2020.

In October 2020 he signed for English club Oldham Athletic. Following the club's relegation to the National League, Bahamboula was released at the end of the 2021–22 season.

On 9 July 2022, Bahamboula signed a two-year contract with Scottish Premiership club Livingston.

International career
Bahamboula was born in France to parents of Congolese descent. Bahamboula was a youth international for France. He was called up to the Republic of the Congo national football team in 2015.

Bahamboula made his senior debut for the Republic of the Congo in a 3–1 2019 Africa Cup of Nations qualification loss to the DR Congo on 10 June 2017.

Personal life
Dylan is the younger brother of the French former footballer and current rapper Plaisir Bahamboula, known by his stage name as OhPlai.

References

External links

1995 births
Living people
Republic of the Congo footballers
Republic of the Congo international footballers
French footballers
France youth international footballers
French sportspeople of Republic of the Congo descent
Ligue 1 players
Ligue 2 players
Liga I players
First Professional Football League (Bulgaria) players
ESA Linas-Montlhéry players
AS Monaco FC players
Paris FC players
Dijon FCO players
FC Astra Giurgiu players
FC Tsarsko Selo Sofia players
Republic of the Congo expatriate footballers
Republic of the Congo expatriate sportspeople in Romania
Expatriate footballers in Romania
Expatriate footballers in Bulgaria
Association football midfielders
Footballers from Essonne
People from Corbeil-Essonnes
Oldham Athletic A.F.C. players
Livingston F.C. players
Expatriate footballers in Monaco
Expatriate footballers in Algeria
Expatriate footballers in France
Expatriate footballers in England
Expatriate footballers in Scotland
Republic of the Congo expatriate sportspeople in Bulgaria
Republic of the Congo expatriate sportspeople in Algeria
Republic of the Congo expatriate sportspeople in Monaco
Republic of the Congo expatriate sportspeople in England
Republic of the Congo expatriate sportspeople in Scotland
Black French sportspeople
Scottish Professional Football League players